Maud is an unincorporated community in Colbert County, Alabama, United States, located  southwest of Cherokee.

References

Unincorporated communities in Colbert County, Alabama
Unincorporated communities in Alabama